Joseph Haydn (1732–1809) was an Austrian composer of the Classical period.

Haydn may also refer to:

 Haydn (name)
 Haydn (crater)

See also 
 The Haydn Quartet
 Hayden (disambiguation)
 Haiden (disambiguation)
 Heiden (disambiguation)
 Heyden (disambiguation)